Citharexylum berlandieri is a species of flowering plant in the verbena family, Verbenaceae, that is native to the Lower Rio Grande Valley of Texas in the United States and Mexico as far south as Oaxaca. Common names include Tamaulipan fiddlewood, Berlandier fiddlewood, negrito fiddlewood, negrito, and orcajuela. The type specimen of this species was collected from the hills near  Las Canoas, San Luis Potosí by Cyrus Pringle in 1890. It was described as a new species the following year by Benjamin Lincoln Robinson, who chose the specific epithet to honour French naturalist Jean-Louis Berlandier.

Uses
The bark of this plant is used for firewood in Mexico.

References

External links
 
 
 

berlandieri
Flora of the Rio Grande valleys
Flora of Northeastern Mexico
Flora of Sinaloa
Flora of Hidalgo (state)
Flora of the State of Mexico
Flora of Veracruz
Flora of Oaxaca
Plants described in 1891
Least concern flora of North America
Least concern flora of the United States